Cuffy, also spelled as Kofi or Koffi (died in 1763), was an Akan man who was captured in his native West Africa and stolen for slavery to work on the plantations of the Dutch colony of Berbice in present-day Guyana. In 1763, he led a major slave revolt of more than 3,800 slaves against the colonial regime. Today, he is a national hero in Guyana.

The Berbice slave uprising 

Coffy lived in Lilienburg, a plantation on the Berbice River, as a house-slave for a cooper (barrel maker). He was owned by the widow Berkey. On 23 February 1763, slaves on plantation Magdalenenberg on the Canje River rebelled, protesting harsh and inhumane treatment. They torched the plantation house, and made for the Courantyne River where Caribs and troops commanded by Governor  of Suriname attacked, and killed them. On 27 February 1763, a revolt took place on the Hollandia plantation next to Lilienburg. Coffy is said to have organized the slaves into a military unit, after which the revolt spread to neighbouring plantations. When Dutch Governor Wolfert Simon Van Hoogenheim sent military assistance to the region, the rebellion had reached the Berbice River and was moving steadily towards the Berbice capital, Fort Nassau. They took gunpowder and guns from the attacked plantations.

By 3 March, the rebels were 600 in number. Led by Cossala, they tried to take the brick house of Peerenboom. They agreed to allow the whites to leave the brick house, but as soon they left, the rebels killed many and took several prisoners, among them Sara George, the 19-year-old daughter of the Peerenboom Plantation owner, whom Coffy kept as his wife.

Coffy was soon accepted by the rebels as their leader and declared himself Governor of Berbice. Doing so he named Captain Accara as his deputy in charge of military affairs, and tried to establish discipline over the troops. Accara was skilful in military discipline. They organized the farms in order to provide food supplies.

Defeat of the rebellion 

Wolfert Simon van Hoogenheim committed himself to retake the colony. Accara attacked the whites three times without permission from Coffy, and eventually the colonists were driven back. Thus began a dispute among the two rebels. On 2 April 1763, Coffy wrote to Van Hoogenheim saying that he did not want a war against the whites and proposed a partition of Berbice with the whites occupying the coastal areas and the blacks the interior. Van Hoogenheim delayed his decision replying that the Society of Berbice in Amsterdam had to make that decision and that it would take three to four months. He was waiting for support from neighboring colonies; a ship from Suriname had already arrived, and reinforcements from Barbados and Sint Eustatius soon followed. Coffy then ordered his forces to attack the whites in May 1763, but in so doing had many losses. The defeat opened a division among the rebels and weakened their organization. Accara became the leader of a new faction opposed to Coffy and led to a civil war among themselves. On 19 October 1763, it was reported to the governor that Captains Atta had revolted against Coffy, and that Coffy had committed suicide. In the meantime, the colonists had already been strengthened by the arrival of soldiers. On 15 April 1764 Captain Accabre, the last of the insurgents, was captured.

National hero 
The anniversary of the Coffy slave rebellion, 23 February, has been Republic Day in Guyana since 1970. Coffy is commemorated in the 1763 Monument in the Square of the Revolution in the capital Georgetown. 

This statue is called the 1763 Monument or the Cuffy Monument. The statue was designed by the Guyanese sculptor Philip Moore. It stands at 15 feet tall and weighs two and a half tons.  

The figure of Cuffy standing on top has many symbols. His pouting mouth symbolizes his defiance, the face on his chest forms a symbolic breastplate that gives protection during battle, and the honed faces on his thighs represent revolutionaries from Guyanese history. He holds in his hands a dog and a pig, both being throttled with the dog representing covetousness and greed while the pig represents ignorance.

See also 
 List of slaves
 Emancipation Statue (Haggett Hall, Barbados)
 Emancipation Park (Kingston, Jamaica)

References

Bibliography

Guyanese military personnel
Rebel slaves
Guyanese slaves
History of Guyana
1763 deaths
Year of birth unknown
Guyanese people of Akan descent
18th-century slaves
18th-century rebels
Berbice